This is a list of airlines currently operating in Papua New Guinea.

See also
 List of airlines
 List of defunct airlines of Oceania

References

Papua New Guinea
Papua New Guinea

Airlines
Airlines